Mother's Wax Museum is a wax museum located in Action Area – II of New Town, Kolkata, India on the 5th and 6th floors of the West Bengal Housing Infrastructure Development Corporation building. Established in November 2014, it contains wax statues of more than 50 personalities, including statues of Bollywood actors Amitabh Bachchan, Shah Rukh Khan and Salman Khan. The museum has been named after Mother Teresa.

Featured wax sculptures

Sports
 Lionel Messi
 Diego Maradona
 Sourav Ganguly
 Kapil Dev
 Sachin Tendulkar
 Virat Kohli

Political
 B. R. Ambedkar
 Netaji Subhas Chandra Bose
 Mohandas Karamchand Gandhi
 Pranab Mukherjee
 Sheikh Mujibur Rahman

Spirituality
 Ramakrishna
 Sarada Devi
 Swami Vivekananda
 Sri Aurobindo

Social
 Raja Rammohan Roy
 Sister Nivedita (presently removed)
 Mother Teresa

Literature
 Rabindranath Tagore
 Iswar Chandra Vidyasagar
 Sarat Chandra Chatterjee
 Kazi Nazrul Islam

Science
 Jagadish Chandra Bose
 Satyendranath Bose
 A. P. J. Abdul Kalam
 Albert Einstein

Music
 Manna Dey
 Pandit Ravi Shankar
 Hemanta Mukherjee
 Kishore Kumar
 Lata Mangeshkar
 Michael Jackson

Bollywood
 Amitabh Bachchan
 Mithun Chakraborty
 Shah Rukh Khan
 Salman Khan (as Inspector Chulbul Pandey)
 Prabhas (as Baahubali) (presently removed)
 Anushka Shetty (as Devasena) (presently removed)

Tollywood
 Uttam Kumar (presently removed)
 Suchitra Sen (presently removed)
 Satyajit Ray

Hollywood
 Tom Cruise
 Brad Pitt
 Angelina Jolie
 Bruce Willis
 Nicole Kidman
 Daniel Craig
 Julia Roberts
 Bruce Lee
 Audrey Hepburn
 Johnny Depp (as Captain Jack Sparrow)
 Rowan Atkinson (as Mr. Bean)
 Daniel Radcliff (as Harry Potter)

References

External links

Wax museums in India
Museums in Kolkata
Museums established in 2014
2014 establishments in West Bengal
New Town, Kolkata
Tourist attractions in North 24 Parganas district